Deepak Kumar (1 April 1946–26 January 2016) was an Indian condensed matter physicist and a professor at the School of Physical Sciences of Jawaharlal Nehru University. Known for his research on quantum mechanics and other areas of condensed matter physics, Kumar was an elected fellow of the Indian Academy of Sciences. The Council of Scientific and Industrial Research, the apex agency of the Government of India for scientific research, awarded him the Shanti Swarup Bhatnagar Prize for Science and Technology, one of the highest Indian science awards, for his contributions to physical sciences in 1988.

Biography 

Born on 1 April 1946 in New Delhi, Kumar completed his early schooling at local schools in 1962 before joining St. Stephen's College, Delhi from where he graduated in science with honors in 1965. He continued his studies at the University of Delhi and after earning a master's degree in physics in 1967, he moved to the US to pursue his doctoral studies under the supervision of A. B. Harris at University of Pennsylvania to secure a PhD in 1972. Subsequently, Kumar returned to India to start his career as a member of faculty of the physics department at University of Roorkee (present-day Indian Institute of Technology Roorkee). He served the institution for 16 years and when Jawaharlal Nehru University established a School of Physical Sciences, Kumar returned to his native place to take up the position of a professor at the school in 1988. In between, he had a short spell in Germany as an Alexander von Humboldt Fellow during 1978–79.

Kumar maintained his association with JNU for the rest of his life and it was during his return from the university on 25 January 2016, he fell ill. He died the next day at a local hospital, at the age of 69, survived by son, Sharad, and daughter Jyoti.

Legacy 
The main focus of Kumar's research in condensed matter physics was the theory related to disordered magnetic systems. At IIT Roorkee, he collaborated with a number of scientists such as Mustansir Barma and S. Shenoy and studied superparamagnetic particles, magnetic anisotropy and disordered ultrametric models. Kumar's work on the percolation threshold of anisotropic magnets widened the understanding of the fractal nature of spin clusters and was one of the first Indian scientists to estimate the consequences of the clusters near the percolation threshold. Binary liquids, statistical mechanics, phase separation, Stern–Gerlach measurement and Bell’s inequality were some of the other areas of his study for which he collaborated with many physicists including Subir Kumar Sarkar, Sanjay Puri, Rupamanjari Ghosh, Ramamurti Rajaraman and A. K. Rastogi. Kumar's studies have been documented by way of a number of articles and the online article repository of Indian Academy of Sciences has listed 98 of them. Besides, he co-edited two books viz. Proceedings Of The Discussion Meeting On Physics Of Defects with C. N. R. Rao, and Proceedings of the Conference on Quantum Many-Body Physics: From cosmology to superconductivity with S. Puri. Kumar also wrote about the sociological aspects of education and research, contributed chapters to books published by others and his work has drawn citations from others.

Awards and honors 
Kumar, an Alexander von Humboldt Fellow, was selected as a senior associate of Abdus Salam International Centre for Theoretical Physics in 1986 and the Indian Academy of Sciences elected him as a fellow in 1987. The Council of Scientific and Industrial Research awarded him the Shanti Swarup Bhatnagar Prize, one of the highest Indian science awards in 1988. Kumar was also associated with Indian Physics Association and Material Research Society of India as a member.

Selected bibliography

See also 

 Order and disorder
 Superparamagnetism
 Bell's theorem

Notes

References

Further reading 
 

Recipients of the Shanti Swarup Bhatnagar Award in Physical Science
Medical doctors from Delhi
Indian scientific authors
1946 births
2016 deaths
People from New Delhi
20th-century Indian physicists
Indian condensed matter physicists
St. Stephen's College, Delhi alumni
Delhi University alumni
University of Pennsylvania alumni
IIT Roorkee
Academic staff of Jawaharlal Nehru University
Fellows of the Indian Academy of Sciences